Cold Hesledon is a village in County Durham, in England. It is situated a short distance to the east of Murton.

Dalton Pumping Station
Within the village is a large Victorian, Gothic Revival former Water pumping station, designed by Thomas Hawksley for the Sunderland and South Shields Water Company. The engine house contains a pair of 72" single-acting non-rotative Cornish beam engines by Davy Bros of Sheffield, dating from the 1870s when the complex was built. (Pumping engines of this period were more often of a double-acting rotative design (as seen at nearby Ryhope); the use of Cornish engines here seems to be due to the great depth of the well - some 450 feet.) The site suffered for many years from subsidence due to nearby mine workings; this in part led to the engines being decommissioned in the 1940s, and to the demolition in the 1960s of the striking campanile-like top section of the central tower/chimney. (The surviving chimney tower at Bestwood Notts., by the same architect, is of an almost identical design.)

The pumping station site was bought in 1995 with a view by its owners to transform it into a pub; however the building became Grade II* listed, which allegedly stopped its development. Other options are now being explored by the owners.

Other notable landmarks
Nearby is Dalton Tower, a ruined tower house.

References

External links

 Conservation Report including photos and illustrations (PDF file)

Villages in County Durham
Preserved beam engines
Water supply pumping stations
Buildings and structures in County Durham
Cornish engines